Marcus Fox (1927–2002) was a British Conservative Party politician.

Marcus Fox may also refer to:
Marcus Fox, fictional character in television series Intruders

See also
Mark Fox (disambiguation)